KLIQ (94.5 FM) is a radio station broadcasting an Regional Mexican format. Licensed to Hastings, Nebraska, United States, the station serves the Grand Island-Kearney area.  The station is currently owned by Flood Communications of Omaha, L.L.C.

History
On May 20, 2022, it was reported that KLIQ will drop its long-time adult contemporary format and "The Breeze" branding on May 23. On that day, at 8 a.m., KLIQ flipped to Regional Mexican, branded as "Fiesta 94.5".

Previous logo

References

External links

LIQ
Regional Mexican radio stations in the United States